"Sometimes I Feel Like a Motherless Child", also "Motherless Child", is a traditional Spiritual. It dates back to the era of slavery in the United States. 

An early performance of the song was in the 1870s by the Fisk Jubilee Singers. Commonly heard during the Civil rights movement in the United States, it has many variations and has been recorded widely.

Description
The song is an expression of pain and despair as the singer compares their hopelessness to that of a child who has been torn from their parents. Under one interpretation, the repetition of the word "sometimes" offers a measure of hope, as it suggests that at least "sometimes" the singer does not feel like a motherless child.

Renditions
Multiple recordings of the song were made by Paul Robeson, starting in 1926.

Bessie Griffin and The Gospel Pearls recorded the song on their Portraits In Bronze album in 1960.

Odetta performed the song at Carnegie Hall on April 8, 1960. The song was included on her album, Odetta at Carnegie Hall the same year. This version was part of the soundtrack of Pier Paolo Pasolini's The Gospel According to St. Matthew (1964). Mary Travers performed the song on Peter, Paul and Mary's album: A Song Will Rise (1965) and on Milt Okun's album: Something to Sing About in 1968. Esther & Abi Ofarim recorded the song for their album Das Neue Esther & Abi Ofarim Album (1966). Richie Havens performed a historical rendition of the song – retitled Freedom (Motherless Child) – on August 15, 1969 at the opening of the Woodstock festival. Elvis used the first verse of the song to open the gospel sequence in his big Comeback Special in 1968, sung by Darlene Love.

Maki Asakawa recorded the song for her debut album The World of Maki Asakawa (1970).

Thea Bowman, a Black Catholic religious sister, recorded the song in 1988 for the stereocassette, "Songs of My People". She then sang it at a meeting of the United States Conference of Catholic Bishops the next year, shortly before her death from cancer, while giving a speech on Black Catholic history and experience. The studio recording was re-released in 2020 for the 30th anniversary of Sister Bowman's death as part of the digital album, Songs of My People: The Complete Collection.

Boney M. recorded a disco version of the song titled "Motherless Child" on their 1977 album Love for Sale with singer Liz Mitchell taking the lead vocal. Liz had previously recorded the song as part of Les Humphries Singers in 1971.

Billy Preston recorded a version of the song titled “Motherless Child” on his 1978 album “Behold!”

Van Morrison recorded a version for his 1987 album Poetic Champions Compose. In his rendition, writes biographer Brian Hinton, "it is 'Mother Ireland' whom Van is missing and his world weary vocals are like sobs of pain."

Martin Gore recorded his rendition of the song (titled only Motherless Child) on his 1989 EP Counterfeit.
Hootie and the Blowfish closed out their biggest-selling 1994 album Cracked Rear View with an a cappella rendition.
Prince performed his rendition of the song at many concerts beginning in 1999. Soprano Barbara Hendricks sang it when she received the 2002 Prince of Asturias Award for the Arts. John Legend sang the song during the Hope for Haiti Now: A Global Benefit for Earthquake Relief telethon in 2010. The song is also included on his 2004 album, Solo Sessions Vol. 1: Live at the Knitting Factory.

Tom Jones included a version on his 1999 album Reload, together with the British band Portishead.

Michael Kiwanuka recorded a version for the Man in the High Castle Album 

In 2022, Jazmine Sullivan recorded a rendition for the soundtrack of Baz Luhrmann's Elvis Presley biopic Elvis.

Kassa Overall created a rendition of the song on his SHADES 3 mixtape in 2023

References

External links
Lyrics as by J. W. Johnson & J. R. Johnson (1926) at negrospirituals.com
Art of the States: Piano Sonata No. 4 musical work quoting the spiritual by African-American composer George Walker
Sometimes a 1976 work for tenor and tape by Olly Wilson, based on the spiritual.

African-American spiritual songs
Eric Burdon songs
Esther & Abi Ofarim songs
Hootie & the Blowfish songs
Louis Armstrong songs
Mildred Bailey songs
The Osmonds songs
Paul Robeson songs
Peter, Paul and Mary songs
Portishead (band) songs
Tom Jones (singer) songs
Van Morrison songs
Protest songs
Songs about children
Songs about parenthood
Songs based on American history
Works about American slavery